The Blind Watchmaker is the fifth album by Mana ERG, released on 15 June 2004 (see 2004 in music).  It builds on Mana ERG's ideas of coalescing forms of techno, drum 'n' bass, experimental and electronic ambient into a collage of modern music.  Produced and recorded by Bruno de Angelis, contributors to the CD include Joe Erber (piano / guitar), Tiberio (guitars), and Lee Stacey (drum loops).  Guest contributors who did some electronic arranging for The Blind Watchmaker include Russian composer Artemiy Artemiev and contemporary electronic creator Dieter Moebius (originally with the band Kluster).

Track listing

Personnel
 Bruno De Angelis - Writer / Recording / Producer / Programming / Vocals / Keys / Guitar
 Martin Bowes - Mastering
 Artemiy Artemiev - Composition
 Deborah Roberts - Vocals
 Tiberio - Guitars
 Joe Erber - Piano
 Antonym - Composition
 Nihm - Didgeridoo / Synth
 Dieter Moebius - Synths
 Lee Stacey - Drum Programming

2004 albums